A. Samraj was an Indian politician and former Member of the Legislative Assembly. He was elected to the Travancore-Cochin assembly as an Indian National Congress candidate from Thovalai Agastheeswaram constituency in 1952 election. It was a two-member constituency and the other winner in the election was T. S. Ramasamy Pillai from the same party.

References 

Year of birth missing
Possibly living people
People from Kanyakumari district
Indian National Congress politicians from Tamil Nadu
Travancore–Cochin MLAs 1952–1954